James George Milligan, Lord Milligan, PC (10 May 1934 – 7 March 2005) was a Scottish lawyer and judge. He was a Senator of the College of Justice from 1988 to 2001.

He was the son of William Milligan, Lord Milligan.

References 

1934 births

2005 deaths

People educated at Rugby School

Alumni of the University of Edinburgh

Alumni of the University of Oxford

Members of the Faculty of Advocates
Scottish King's Counsel
20th-century King's Counsel
Senators of the College of Justice
Members of the Privy Council of the United Kingdom